Gewerbeschule is a quarter in the district 5 in Zürich.

The district Gewerbeschule (upper district 5, there are located several Business schools) formed the formerly separate municipality of Aussersihl, which was incorporated into Zürich in 1893. The separation into the current districts 3, 4 and 5 dates to 1913.

References 

District 5 of Zürich
Former municipalities of the canton of Zürich